Di(propylene glycol) methyl ether is an organic solvent with a variety of industrial and commercial uses. It finds use as a less volatile alternative to propylene glycol methyl ether and other glycol ethers.  The commercial product is typically a mixture of four isomers.

References

Alcohol solvents
Ether solvents